The Teng Feng Fish Ball Museum is a food museum about fish balls in Tamsui District, New Taipei, Taiwan.

History
The museum was established in 2004.

Architecture
The museum building is divided into two exhibition halls. The first exhibition hall is located on Tamsui Old Street consists of three floors. The second exhibition hall is located at where the Weixiang Fish Ball Shop used to be.

Exhibitions
The museum displays the production and environmental impact of creating fish ball products. There are also a number of production equipment.

Transportation
The museum is accessible within walking distance northwest from Tamsui Station of the Taipei Metro.

See also
 List of museums in Taiwan

References

External links

 

2004 establishments in Taiwan
Food museums in Taiwan
Industry museums in Taiwan
Museums established in 2004
Museums in New Taipei